Maslenica Bridge (but also known as ) is a  long reinforced concrete arch bridge spanning the Novsko Ždrilo strait of the Adriatic Sea, north of Zadar, Croatia, carrying the Croatian A1 motorway. It is located between the Maslenica and Posedarje interchanges of the A1 motorway.

The arch comprises a box cross section, a double cell of constant depth. The superstructure is continuous across 12 spans, consisting of prestressed girders made monolithic with the in situ cast deck slab and transverse girders.

The bridge is maintained and operated by Croatian Motorways Ltd.

Approximately  to the south, there is another bridge, carrying D8 state road across the same strait, and this was the original crossing point over the strait. Although that is a completely different structure, carrying a different road, that bridge is also officially called Maslenica Bridge. The bridge carrying the A1 motorway is actually older than the one carrying the D8 road, however since the latter is a replacement for a bridge destroyed in the Croatian War of Independence in 1991, both A1 and D8 bridges are known to be referred to as both old and new Maslenica Bridge.

Construction

The bridge was designed by Jure Radić, and built by Konstruktor, Split, between 1993 and 1996, using free cantilevering with  temporary cable-stays. Prefabricated girders required for the structure were executed and prestressed in a purpose built plant on the site. The same plant was subsequently used to produce Jersey barriers used as bridge protective barriers.

The bridge is significant as it is the first motorway reinforced-concrete arch bridge comprising a substantial span executed in Croatia.

On 21 December 1998 the speed of a gust of wind on the Maslenica Bridge was measured at a record speed of 248 kilometres per hour.

Traffic volume
Traffic is regularly counted and reported by Hrvatske autoceste, operator of the bridge and the A1 motorway where the bridge is located, and published by Hrvatske ceste. Substantial variations between annual (AADT) and summer (ASDT) traffic volumes are attributed to the fact that the bridge carries substantial tourist traffic to the Dalmatian Adriatic resorts. The traffic count is performed using analysis of motorway toll ticket sales.

See also
List of arch bridges by length
List of bridges by length

References

Deck arch bridges
Bridges completed in 1997
Toll bridges in Croatia
Concrete bridges
Buildings and structures in Zadar County
Cross-sea bridges in Croatia
Transport in Zadar County